Alibeyköy is a metro station on the M7 line of the Istanbul Metro in Eyüpsultan. The station is located on Atatürk Street in the Alibeyköy neighborhood of Eyüpsultan.

The station is located on a viaduct on Alibeyköy Creek. Access to the platforms of the station is provided by the entrances on both sides of the stream.

The M7 line operates as fully automatic unattended train operation (UTO). The station consists of an island platform with two tracks. Since the M7 is an ATO line, protective gates on each side of the platform open only when a train is in the station.

Connection to Istanbul Tram is available. Alibeyköy metro station was opened on 28 October 2020.

Station layout

Operation information 
As of 2021, total length of M7 line is 18 km. The line operates between 06.00 - 00.00 and travel frequency is 6 minutes at peak hour.

Gallery

References

External links 

 Official Website of Istanbul Metro (in English)

Railway stations opened in 2020
Istanbul metro stations
2020 establishments in Turkey